Izboskan is a district of Andijan Region in Uzbekistan. The capital lies at the city Paytug.

The district consists of 1 city (Paytug), 4 urban-type settlements (Gurkirov, Maygir, Toʻrtkoʻl and Uzun koʻcha) and 9 rural communities.

References

Districts of Uzbekistan
Andijan Region